The 1929–30 Scottish Second Division was won by Leith Athletic who, along with second placed East Fife, were promoted to the First Division. Brechin City finished bottom.

Table

References 

 Scottish Football Archive

Scottish Division Two seasons
2
Scot